Batmobile may refer to:

 Batmobile, the vehicle used by Batman
 Batmobile (band), a psychobilly group
 A racing version of the BMW 3.0CSL as driven in the European Touring Car Championship of the 1970s
 "Batmobile", the name of an episode of The Drew Carey Show